Fritz Stapenhorst was a German film director and editor. He was the son of the producer Günther Stapenhorst.

Selected filmography

Editor
 The Girl from the Marsh Croft (1935)
 The Girl of Last Night (1938)
 Kitty and the World Conference (1939)
 Keepers of the Night (1949)
 Where the Trains Go (1949)
 Two Times Lotte (1950)
 Doctor Praetorius (1950)
 My Name is Niki (1952)
 Nights on the Road (1952)
 Hocuspocus (1953)
 Heroism after Hours (1955)

Director
  (1955, anthology film)
  (1955, anthology film)
  (1958)
 Als ich noch der Waldbauernbub war... (1963, TV film)
 Aus meiner Waldheimat (1963, TV film)
 Als ich beim Käthele im Wald war (1963, TV film)

References

Bibliography
 Wolfgang Jacobsen & Hans Helmut Prinzler. Käutner. Spiess, 1992.

External links

Year of birth unknown
Year of death unknown
German film directors
German film editors